The South River is a  river in Caroline County in the U.S. state of Virginia.  It is a tributary of the Mattaponi River.

Rising at the boundary between Caroline County and Spotsylvania County, the South River flows east, passing under U.S. Route 1 and Interstate 95, joining the Mattaponi north of Milford.  Via the Mattaponi and York rivers, the South River is part of the Chesapeake Bay watershed.

See also
List of rivers of Virginia

References

USGS Hydrologic Unit Map - State of Virginia (1974)

Rivers of Virginia
Tributaries of the York River (Virginia)
Rivers of Caroline County, Virginia